Lottia argrantesta is a species of limpet in the family Lottiidae. It was first described in 2003. It is native to the Gulf of California.

References

External links
Bouchet, P. (2015). Lottia argrantesta Simison & Lindberg, 2003. In: MolluscaBase (2015). Accessed through: World Register of Marine Species.

Lottiidae
Gastropods described in 2003
Marine fauna of the Gulf of California